Julia Caba Alba (31 July 1902 – 14 November 1988) was a Spanish actress who appeared in more than a hundred films and television series during her career. She was a noted character actress. Her sister was the actress Irene Caba Alba.

Selected filmography
 Saint Rogelia (1940)
 The Sin of Rogelia Sanchez (1940)
 The Bullfighter's Suit (1947)
 Anguish (1947)
 The Sunless Street (1948)
 Just Any Woman (1949)
 Ninety Minutes (1949)
 The Duchess of Benameji (1949)
 The Maragatan Sphinx (1950)
 Black Sky (1951)
 Our Lady of Fatima (1951)
 Malibran's Song (1951)
 Captain Poison (1951)
 From Madrid to Heaven (1952)
 The Song of Sister Maria (1952)
 Sister San Sulpicio (1952)
 Such is Madrid (1953)
I Was a Parish Priest. (1953)
 Airport (1953)
 Morena Clara (1954)
 Malvaloca (1954)
 An Andalusian Gentleman (1954)
 It Happened in Seville (1955)
 Let's Make the Impossible! (1958)
 Luxury Cabin (1959)
 Maribel and the Strange Family (1960)
 You and Me Are Three (1962)
 Queen of The Chantecler (1962)
 Aragonese Nobility (1965)
 He's My Man! (1966)
 Road to Rocío (1966)
 Fruit of Temptation (1968)
 The Man Who Wanted to Kill Himself (1970)

References

Bibliography 
 Mira, Alberto. The A to Z of Spanish Cinema. Rowman & Littlefield, 2010.

External links 
 

1902 births
1988 deaths
Spanish film actresses
People from Madrid
20th-century Spanish actresses